The 2014 Kobalt 400 was a NASCAR Sprint Cup Series stock car race held on March 9, 2014, at Las Vegas Motor Speedway in Las Vegas, Nevada. Contested over 267 laps on the  asphalt tri-oval, it was the third race of the 2014 NASCAR Sprint Cup Series. Brad Keselowski won the race, his first win of the season, after Dale Earnhardt Jr. ran out of fuel half a lap from the finish. Earnhardt Jr. still finished second, while Paul Menard, Joey Logano, and Carl Edwards rounded out the top five. The top rookies of the race were Austin Dillon (16th), Kyle Larson (19th), and Michael Annett (29th).

Previous week's race
Kevin Harvick held off Dale Earnhardt Jr. in the final nine laps to score victory in The Profit on CNBC 500 at Phoenix International Raceway. Harvick praised his Stewart-Haas Racing team for the efforts in the early part of the season, since his move from Richard Childress Racing, stating "to add an extra team, bring in a bunch of new guys, new driver, Rodney Childers has just done a phenomenal job of putting this team together. These guys all want to win that is why they came here". He added that he was "really happy" with the engine that had been provided by Hendrick Motorsports. Earnhardt Jr. was disappointed to miss out on the victory, stating that he "would have loved to have won the race, am a little disappointed to have come that close", but like Harvick, praised his team for their performances, adding that they have "a lot of great chemistry and good communication going back and forth. Everybody's confidence is very high. Everybody's mood and morale is really high".

Report

Background

The track, Las Vegas Motor Speedway is a four-turn,  D-shaped oval track that has sanctioned NASCAR Sprint Cup Series events since 1996. After being reconfigured in 2007, the track has a 20° banking in each of the turns, while the rounded front stretch and the back straightaway has a 9° banking. Las Vegas Motor Speedway also has a grandstand seating capacity of 138,000 people. Matt Kenseth was the defending winner of the race.

Entry list
The entry list for the Kobalt 400 was released on Thursday, March 6 at 3:08 p.m. Eastern time. Forty-eight cars were entered for the race.

Practice

First practice

Qualifying
The race was the first to use the three-round knockout format for 1.25 miles (2.00 km) and longer tracks.

  The first round is 25 minutes.  Competitors may drive as many laps as they wish, the fastest lap will count.  
  The 24 fastest competitors in the first round advance to the second round.
  Those finishing in 25th-36th position start based on their speed.
  Those failing to qualify will have their owner points totals calculated.  The six teams with the most owner points (previous year's at this race only) will take 37–42.
  The most recent former Sprint Cup champion not in the field will then be added, if necessary.  If not, the seventh highest team in owner points not in the field will take the 43rd position.
  Positions 37-43 will be ranked by speed.
  The second round is ten minutes.
 The 12 fastest competitors advancing to the final round.
 Those failing to advance will start 13th-24th based on their speed in the second round.
  The final round is five minutes.
 The fastest driver in this round starts first.
 Positions 2-12 will be determined by their fastest laps in this round only.

Logano stated that to "have a Penske front row the last two weekends at two completely different race tracks just goes to show how hard these guys have been working", while also stating that the team "obviously haven't won on Sunday yet, so we've got to figure out the big show, but we've had some good speed in our cars". Keselowski added that his car needed "a little bit more in race trim", and that he would "get a better idea and read for that tomorrow when we get back in race trim, but qualifying trim I think we've got our cars really refined well for this package and I'm very proud of where we're at".

The issue of cool down laps came up again since NASCAR does not allow teams to use cool down units. Clint Bowyer stated that he was "not a huge fan of the cool down deal", and hoped NASCAR would look into the situation in regards to the closing speeds on track. Kasey Kahne cut a tire down on his cool down lap. Upon exiting his car, Kahne felt that "NASCAR doesn't have enough people to make a call that we can change it" and that he "sat there and waited and we didn't get to cool our car down". Dave Blaney, Landon Cassill, Blake Koch, Joe Nemechek and J. J. Yeley failed to qualify.

Qualifying results

Practice (post-qualifying)

Second practice

Final practice

Race

First half

The race began at 3:20 p.m. when Joey Logano led the field to the green flag. The first caution of the race flew on lap 17 after Josh Wise's engine expired on the backstretch. Brad Keselowski stayed out when the leaders pitted and assumed the lead for the restart on lap 23. Immediately thereafter, Keselowski spun his tires and lost the lead to teammate Logano. Debris in turn 3 brought out the second caution of the race on lap 45. Jimmie Johnson took just two tires, and beat Logano in the race off pit road, and led the field to the restart on lap 50. Kyle Busch took the lead from Johnson on lap 77 and held the lead to the next round of pit stops, on lap 96. Dale Earnhardt Jr. inherited the lead for a lap before he pitted, when the lead returned to Busch. Busch retained the lead to almost half distance, when Kevin Harvick took the lead on lap 130. He held the lead until his next pit stop on lap 140.

Second half
Busch, Keselowski and Matt Kenseth each had short spells out front before the lead re-cycled to Harvick, on lap 144. Debris on the backstretch brought out the third caution of the race on lap 155. Keselowski stayed out when the others pitted, to retake the lead for the restart on lap 161. With 73 laps to go, Harvick started having engine troubles that took him out of the race; this was the first of five straight races where he was plagued by mechanical trouble. The following lap, Keselowski gave up the lead to pit, when Johnson reclaimed the lead. Paul Menard moved to the front with 68 laps to go, but pitted with 62 laps to go and Johnson assumed the lead. He pitted the next lap to pass the lead to Earnhardt. Denny Hamlin took the lead with 56 laps to go, but pitted the next lap and the lead returned to Keselowski. Debris on the frontstretch brought out the fourth caution with 47 laps to go. Earnhardt Jr. stayed out when the leaders pitted to take the lead for the restart with 42 laps to go.

Final lap
On the final lap of the race, Earnhardt Jr. ran out of gas exiting turn 2 and Keselowski passed him to take the checkered flag. Keselowski praised his Team Penske organization, stating that they were "just doing everything so well right now", while also stating his pleasure with the victory and the added bonus of being a competitor in the Chase for the Sprint Cup later in the season, stating that he did not "have to hear all that crap all year long about not being in the Chase". Earnhardt Jr. was disappointed with the way that his race finished, describing running out of gas as "tough", while stating that he and his team "have got a good thing going, we've got to be positive. We've got to keep trying to win races. I know my fans are disappointed, but we got to stay positive".

Race results

Race summary
 Lead changes: 21 among different drivers
 Cautions/Laps: 4 for 18
 Red flags: 0
 Time of race: 2 hours, 35 minutes and 24 seconds
 Average speed:

Media

Television

Radio

Standings after the race

Drivers' Championship standings

Manufacturers' Championship standings

Note: Only the first sixteen positions are included for the driver standings.

References

Kobalt 400
Kobalt 400
Kobalt 400
NASCAR races at Las Vegas Motor Speedway